Declan Hughes (born 27 April 1973) is a former professional snooker player from Northern Ireland.

Career
He played on the main tour for the 2008–09 season; he qualified by topping the Northern Ireland amateur rankings. After failing to win a match in the season's opening events, he did not compete in the remainder of tournaments.

He won the Northern Ireland Amateur Championship and the Pontins Spring Open in 1992. He is also a pool player, winning the Irish 9-ball championship in 2008.

Career finals

Pro-am finals: 1 (1 title)

Amateur finals: 1 (1 title)

References

External links
 World Snooker.com

Living people
Snooker players from Northern Ireland
1973 births